
Gmina Staroźreby is a rural gmina (administrative district) in Płock County, Masovian Voivodeship, in east-central Poland.

Areas of the administrative district are situated on the area of Masovia-Podlaskie land in the river basin of Wkra and the Vistula rivers. In the landscape flatlands are dominating and lightly wavy. They are reweighing pine, alder and birchen forests. In the local river basin Płonka a natural-landscape fall-rope is found, on the land which is building one's nests great crested grebe protected.

Villages
Gmina Staroźreby contains the villages and settlements of Aleksandrowo, Begno, Bromierz, Bromierzyk, Brudzyno, Bylino, Dąbrusk, Dłużniewo Duże, Falęcin, Góra, Goszczyno, Karwowo-Podgórne, Kierz, Krzywanice, Krzywanice-Trojany, Marychnów, Mieczyno, Mikołajewo, Mrówczewo, Nowa Góra, Nowa Wieś, Nowe Staroźreby, Nowe Żochowo, Nowy Bromierz, Nowy Bromierzyk, Opatówiec, Ostrzykówek, Piączyn, Płonna, Przeciszewo, Przeciszewo-Kolonia, Przedbórz, Przedpełce, Rogowo, Rostkowo, Rostkowo-Orszymowice, Sarzyn, Sędek, Słomkowo, Smardzewo, Staroźreby, Staroźreby-Hektary, Stoplin, Strzeszewo, Szulbory, Teodorowo, Worowice-Wyroby, Zdziar Mały, Zdziar Wielki, Zdziar-Las and Żochowo Stare.

Neighbouring gminas
Gmina Staroźreby is bordered by the gminas of Baboszewo, Bielsk, Bulkowo, Drobin, Dzierzążnia, Raciąż and Radzanowo.

References
Polish official population figures 2006

Starozreby
Płock County